Events in the year 1931 in Norway.

Incumbents
Monarch – Haakon VII
Prime Minister – Peder Kolstad

Events
 8 June – The Menstad conflict.
 27 June – Norway occupied and claimed parts of the then-uninhabited eastern Greenland (also called Erik the Red's Land), claiming that it constituted terra nullius.
 Municipal and county elections are held throughout the country.

Popular culture

Sports

Music

Film

Literature

Notable births
 
 
10 January – Olaf B. Bjørnstad, ski jumper (died 2013).
26 January – Jon Gjønnes, physicist (died 2021).
27 January – Sissel Lange-Nielsen, writer, literary critic, and journalist
31 January – Ole Gabriel Ueland, politician (died 2009).
22 February – Georg Johannesen, author and professor of rhetoric (died 2005)
4 March – Ludvig Hope Faye, politician (died 2017).
12 March – Knut Bohwim, film director (died 2020).
23 March – Kjell Knudsen, politician
2 April – Åslaug Grinde, politician
5 April – Peter R. Holm, poet, author and translator
11 April – Olav Marås, politician
24 April – Eva Seeberg, journalist and writer (died 2019).
26 April – Øyvind Bjorvatn, politician
26 April – Ola Mikal Heide, botanist
27 April – Vera Louise Holmøy, judge
28 April – Karen Sogn, politician
9 May – Erik Dammann, author and environmentalist
19 May – Leif Raa, illustrator (died 2003).
25 May - Selmer Nilsen, fisherman who spied for the KGB (died 1991)
31 May - Yngvar Løchen, sociologist (died 1998)
5 June - Einar Magnussen, economist and politician (died 2004)
18 June - Eigil Nansen, human rights activist
20 June – Arne Nordheim, composer
8 July – Thorvald Stoltenberg, politician and Minister (died 2018).
24 July – Sverre Holm, actor (died 2005)
8 August – Halvor Bergan, theologian (died 2015).
25 August – Sven Ivar Dysthe, furniture designer (died 2020).
5 September – Torstein Slungård, politician
1 October – Tore Haugen, politician
6 October – Johan M. Nyland, politician (died 2007)
11 October – Bjørn Slettan, historian
12 October – Ole-Johan Dahl, computer scientist (died 2002)
6 November – Bjartmar Gjerde, politician
8 November – Ole Knapp, politician and Minister
23 November – Karin Stoltenberg, geneticist, politician (died 2012).
30 November – Knut Myhre, politician
7 December – Bjørg Lødøen, painter, graphic artist and composer
15 December – Alf Nordvang, actor and theatre director (died 2007)

Notable deaths

31 March – Knute Rockne, American football player and coach (born 1888)
23 April – Nils P. Haugen, a U.S. Representative from Wisconsin (born 1849)
26 April – Axel Holst, professor of hygiene and bacteriology (born 1860)
14 August – Olav Johan Sopp, mycologist (born 1860)
1 September – Anders Andersen, politician (born 1846)
27 September – Thorleif Frederik Schjelderup, businessperson (born 1859)
5 November – Ole Edvart Rølvaag, novelist and professor in America (born 1876)
11 November – Marie Hauge, painter (born 1864)
17 December – Hans Nilsen Hauge, priest, politician and Minister (born 1853)

Full date unknown
Sophus Christian Munk Aars, civil servant and writer (born 1841)
Johan Aschehoug Kiær, paleontologist and geologist (born 1869)

See also

References

External links